Théo Pionnier-Bertrand (born 21 January 2002) is a French professional footballer who plays as a defender for Quevilly-Rouen II.

Career
Pionnier made his professional debut with Nice in a 1–0 UEFA Europa League loss to Hapoel Be'er Sheva on 10 December 2020.

References

External links
 
 
 OGC Nice Profile

2002 births
Living people
People from Gap, Hautes-Alpes
French footballers
OGC Nice players
Championnat National 3 players
Association football defenders
Sportspeople from Hautes-Alpes
Footballers from Provence-Alpes-Côte d'Azur